Clostebol caproate (brand name Macrobin-Depot), also known as clostebol hexanoate or chlorotestosterone caproate (JAN), as well as 4-chlorotestosterone 17β-caproate or as 4-chloroandrost-4-en-17β-ol-3-one 17β-caproate, is a synthetic, injected anabolic-androgenic steroid (AAS) and a derivative of testosterone. It is an androgen ester – specifically, the C17β caproate ester of clostebol (4-chlorotestosterone) – and acts as a prodrug of clostebol in the body. Clostebol acetate is administered via intramuscular injection.

See also
 Clostebol acetate
 Clostebol propionate
 Norclostebol
 Norclostebol acetate
 Oxabolone
 Oxabolone cipionate

References

Androgen esters
Androgens and anabolic steroids
Androstanes
Caproate esters
Organochlorides
Prodrugs
World Anti-Doping Agency prohibited substances